Unisonic is the debut album by the hard rock/power metal band Unisonic. It was released in 2012 on earMUSIC. The album is the group's first full-length studio release and since Keeper of the Seven Keys, Pt. 2 (1988) by Helloween the first album to feature both Kai Hansen and Michael Kiske performing on all songs.

Production
The majority of the songs were written by Dennis Ward and Kai Hansen, with further input from Mandy Meyer and Michael Kiske. A music video was filmed for the song .

The album was released on 21 March 2012 in Japan, on 30 March 2012 in Europe and on 22 May 2012 in the US, with cover art credited to Martin Häusler. The album became available in several special editions, such as the European (Mediabook), the Japanese and the US, each containing a different bonus track.

Unisonic's debut album entered several international music charts, scoring the highest points on the Finnish albums chart, Japanese albums chart, German albums chart and Swedish albums chart.

Accolades

In Burrn! magazine's 2012 Readers Poll, Unisonic ranked at #2 (behind Accept's Stalingrad) for Best Album and the title track won Best Song.

Track listing

Personnel
 Michael Kiske - lead vocals
 Kai Hansen - lead & rhythm guitars, backing vocals, co-producer
 Mandy Meyer - lead & rhythm guitars
 Dennis Ward - bass, backing vocals, producer, engineer, mixing
 Kosta Zafiriou - drums, percussion

Guest session musician
 Günter Werno - keyboards on tracks 2, 4 & 12

Charts

References

External links
 Unisonic official website
 EarMusic official website
 'Unisonic' - Uber Rock Album Review

2012 debut albums
Albums produced by Dennis Ward (musician)
Albums produced by Kai Hansen